Trent Jason Green (born July 9, 1970) is a former American football quarterback who played in the National Football League (NFL) for fifteen seasons.  He played college football for Indiana University. He was drafted by the San Diego Chargers in the eighth round of the 1993 NFL Draft, and also played for the BC Lions, Washington Redskins, St. Louis Rams, Kansas City Chiefs, and Miami Dolphins. He earned a Super Bowl ring with the Rams in Super Bowl XXXIV over the Tennessee Titans and was selected to two Pro Bowls with the Chiefs.

Green is one of 13 quarterbacks to have completed a 99-yard pass play in the NFL. Since his retirement from playing Green has worked as an NFL color analyst on radio and television.

Early life
Green grew up in St. Louis, Missouri, and attended St. John Vianney High School in Kirkwood, Missouri, a suburb of St. Louis.

College career
Green played college football for the Indiana University Hoosiers. In 1991 Indiana played in the Copper Bowl and dominated a highly regarded Baylor team 24-0. Led by Green, it was one of the most impressive performances by any team during the 1991 bowl season. During Green's four-year career he threw for 5,400 yards with 23 touchdowns and 31 interceptions. He graduated with a degree in business.

Professional career

Early career (San Diego Chargers, BC Lions, Washington Redskins)
In 1993, Green was drafted as the twenty-sixth pick in the eighth round and 222nd overall by the San Diego Chargers. He spent a year as a backup and saw no playing time. After being cut in 1994 by the British Columbia Lions of the CFL, he joined the Washington Redskins. Outside of one pass thrown in 1997, he would not see NFL action until 1998, when he threw for 3,441 yards, 23 touchdowns, and 11 interceptions.

Green's breakout season came just in time, as he became an unrestricted free agent after the 1998 season. He rejected a four-year, $12 million offer from the Redskins.

First stint with Rams
On February 15, 1999, Green agreed to a four-year, $17.5 million contract with the St. Louis Rams which included a $4.5 million signing bonus.
In 1999, Green was slated to be the starter for the Rams, but suffered a gruesome season-ending knee injury in a preseason game on a hit by Rodney Harrison of the Chargers. Unheralded backup Kurt Warner took over for Green, and led the Rams to a 13–3 season, culminating in a dramatic 23–16 victory over the Tennessee Titans in Super Bowl XXXIV.

In 2000, Green began the season as the backup to Warner, the reigning NFL MVP. He started five games in the middle of the season while Warner was out with a broken hand. Green and Warner combined to lead the Rams to the then-highest team passing yards total in NFL history. With Warner back at quarterback, the Rams were upset in the wild card round by the New Orleans Saints. Green was traded during the offseason to the Kansas City Chiefs for the 12th overall pick in the 2001 NFL Draft.

Kansas City Chiefs
During his first season in Kansas City, Green struggled despite the presence of tight end Tony Gonzalez, and running back Priest Holmes. He threw for 3,783 yards and 17 touchdowns, but also threw 24 interceptions. Green displayed marked improvement in 2002, throwing 26 touchdowns to only 13 interceptions as the Chiefs went 8-8.  Green tied the record for the longest career pass play in NFL history (99 yards) on December 22, 2002, on a pass to Marc Boerigter in a game against the San Diego Chargers. In 2003, Green had his breakout year, throwing for 4,039 yards, 24 touchdowns, and 12 interceptions. He led the Chiefs to a 13–3 record and a first-round bye in the playoffs. However, in the divisional playoff game, they lost a 38–31 shootout to Peyton Manning and the Indianapolis Colts. The game was notable for there being no punts by either team, a first in NFL playoff history. Green was selected to his first Pro Bowl that year. The next season, the Chiefs went 7–9 as  Holmes suffered a knee injury in their eighth game, against the Tampa Bay Buccaneers in Tampa, Florida and missed the rest of the regular season. At the time, he was leading the league in both rushing and scoring. However, Green still had a stellar year, passing for 4,591 yards, 27 touchdowns, and 17 interceptions. His passing total for 2004 was second only to Minnesota's Daunte Culpepper.

In 2005, the Chiefs, with an improved defense, improved their record to 10–6, but failed to make the playoffs. Green had another strong season in 2005, throwing for 4,010 yards (second only to New England's Tom Brady), and throwing just 10 interceptions, his lowest season total ever.  Green was elected to his second Pro Bowl following the season. Green has the distinction of having four consecutive seasons with a QB rating of 90.0 or better, three of those with over 4,000 passing yards. Green has started 80 consecutive games during his first five years with the Chiefs, a team record.

Green's 2006 season was put in jeopardy by a severe concussion he suffered during the first game of the season on September 10, 2006, against the Cincinnati Bengals in Kansas City. Green attempted to slide during a third-quarter play, but was hit hard by Cincinnati defensive end Robert Geathers, who had lowered his shoulders, but instead struck the quarterback in an unusual position. However, the official determined that no foul had been committed and Geathers insisted that he had tried to check up, but was pushed by Chiefs receiver Eddie Kennison. CBS announcer Randy Cross, a former offensive lineman with the San Francisco 49ers, believed the hit was unintentional and supported the officials' decision. National Football League officials took the same position and, on September 13, 2006, declined to fine Robert Geathers because he did not have complete control of his body. Green was rendered unconscious and the game was delayed for over fifteen minutes while he received medical attention. He reportedly regained consciousness in the tunnel and could not recall the play.  According to Chiefs general manager Carl Peterson, preliminary doctor's visits revealed a "very, very severe concussion" and stated that Green would be out indefinitely.

On Saturday, October 21, 2006, it was reported that Green was cleared by doctors to return to practice.  Chiefs president and general manager Carl Peterson said that this did not mean that he was cleared to play. Peterson confirmed that Green's return to practice would be in a controlled environment to see how far along he is in his recovery from a "very, very severe concussion."

On November 15, 2006, Kansas City Chiefs head coach, Herman Edwards announced that Green would take back his starting quarterback job from Damon Huard who took over when Green suffered a concussion.

Green's career in Kansas City ended with another playoff loss against Peyton Manning and the  Indianapolis Colts in the Wild-Card round of the 2006 NFL Playoffs.

On February 27, 2007, Damon Huard was re-signed by the Chiefs for $7.5 million over three years, causing a "quarterback controversy" in Kansas City. Green initially was asked to take a pay cut in his 2007 salary, and had been granted permission to seek a trade to another team. Teams interested included the Miami Dolphins (who offered a seventh-round draft pick to the Chiefs, but the Chiefs declined, instead seeking a fifth-round pick), the Detroit Lions, and Cleveland Browns were also interested in Green prior to the 2007 NFL Draft. Green was not traded on draft weekend as previously expected. Green said he would not return to Kansas City, therefore making his release possible. Green had told the Chiefs that Miami was his preference being that he previously worked under both head coach Cam Cameron and quarterbacks coach Terry Shea.

Miami Dolphins
On June 5, 2007, the Chiefs agreed to trade Green to the Miami Dolphins for a conditional fifth-round pick in the 2008 NFL Draft, pending a physical from Green which was subsequently passed.  Green was introduced at a news conference in Miami on June 6. The draft pick would have become a fourth-round pick if Green played more than 70 percent of Miami's offensive plays. On August 20 the Dolphins named Green the starter with Cleo Lemon named as his backup, despite the fact that neither of them had thrown a touchdown pass to that point in pre-season play. Second-round pick John Beck was named third string.

Green's position with his new team—as well as his career—was instantly put in jeopardy on October 7 as he suffered another severe concussion early in a game against the Texans at Houston. With just under 4 minutes to play in the first quarter, Green put his shoulder low to the knees of 315-pound Houston defensive tackle Travis Johnson in a successful attempt to block him on a play that started with a fumbled handoff to Dolphins rookie wide receiver Ted Ginn Jr. Ginn, who was running right-to-left across the backfield when the exchange was fumbled, recovered the ball near the sidelines and then reversed field. Johnson went down in a sprawling tumble on the block at the same time Green fell face-down to the turf, knocked out cold after striking Johnson's knee with his helmet. Johnson, upon getting up and seeing Ginn had been stopped and the play ended, immediately walked towards Green's body, jabbing his finger at the motionless quarterback. Johnson was flagged with a 15-yard penalty for taunting, and medical personnel quickly made their way to Green. After being examined on the field for nearly five minutes, Green was carted off on a stretcher as Cleo Lemon stepped in to take his place.

After the game an angry Travis Johnson had harsh words for Green, comparing him to "the scarecrow [who] wants to get courage" and calling the block "malicious."  Texans head coach Gary Kubiak, while in some ways siding with Johnson in saying that NFL officials should review the rules on "chop" blocks, also called Johnson's reaction over a fallen player "inexcusable."

While many fans and sportswriters alike called for Green to retire,  Green was back with the team in practice, albeit in street clothes, the Friday after the injury after returning from Kansas City where he was evaluated by the same medical team that made the diagnosis in 2006. Coach Cam Cameron had initially expressed his plans for Green to return to the game before the end of the 2007 season.  However, on October 20, 2007, the Dolphins announced that Green would be placed on injured reserve, and made Cleo Lemon their starting quarterback. Following the season, Green became one of nine players released by the Dolphins on February 11, 2008.

Second stint with Rams
On March 10, 2008, Green agreed to a three-year deal worth about $9 million with the St. Louis Rams, rejoining the team he played for in 1999 and 2000. On September 23, 2008, Green was named the starter for week 4 versus the Buffalo Bills. He completed 17 of 32 passes for 236 yards with one interception and a quarterback rating of 64.1. On November 9, 2008, against the Jets, Green took over for Marc Bulger after Bulger was shut out by the Jets in the first half. The Rams released Green on February 25, 2009.

Retirement
Green retired from professional football on June 12, 2009, citing a desire to pursue a career in broadcasting. Green's agent, Jim Steiner, said "He had a long, prosperous, very successful career. He believes he can still play, but the demand isn't real high out there right now and he's not the type of guy who is going to sit around for four or five months waiting for the phone to ring."

NFL career statistics

Regular season

Postseason

Post-NFL career
In the 2009 NFL season, Green started doing work as a color analyst on regional NFL games for the Fox network for one season, as well as a studio analyst for the NFL Total Access show on the NFL Network. He also worked with Ian Eagle calling Thursday Night Football games on Westwood One radio and with Paul Burmeister on Kansas City Chiefs preseason broadcasts. In April 2014, Green was hired by CBS as an NFL analyst alongside Greg Gumbel, and later with Kevin Harlan.
Trent Green sometimes works as a guest analyst for the NFL on Westwood One.

In July 2012, Green was named the forty-first greatest quarterback of the NFL's post-merger era, according to Football Nation.

On November 22, 2016, Green was named the Big Ten's Dungy-Thompson Humanitarian Award winner.

Personal life
Green has 2 sons and a daughter. One son, Trent Jr. (T.J.), is a quarterback for Northwestern. His other son Derek, is a former SMU and Long Island University quarterback that now plays for the Stainless Steel Warriors, a team of the Italian Football League.

See also
 Most consecutive starts by a quarterback (NFL)

References

External links

1970 births
Living people
American football quarterbacks
BC Lions players
American Conference Pro Bowl players
Indiana Hoosiers football players
Kansas City Chiefs players
Miami Dolphins players
National Football League announcers
Sportspeople from Cedar Rapids, Iowa
Players of American football from Iowa
Players of American football from St. Louis
Players of Canadian football from St. Louis
San Diego Chargers players
St. Louis Rams players
Washington Redskins players
Alliance of American Football announcers
Ed Block Courage Award recipients